Hegar dilators are dilators used to treat vaginismus, induce cervical dilation, and for inflatable penile implant procedures.

Description

Hegar dilators were developed and introduced by Alfred Hegar in 1879 originally for use in the field of Gynecology. Typically, dilators are a set of metal rods of increasing diameters, from a few millimeters up to 26 millimeters. The rods are round, slightly curved, and have a conal tip. Some sets have conal tips at both ends, while others have one end flattened for easy handling. Hegar dilators are typically marked with a Hegar number that is equivalent to its size in millimeters (e.g. a Hegar size 8 is 8mm thick). Commercially available Hegar dilators are commonly sold in sets of 8, 10, or 14 individual rods. Each set includes a range of sizes, popularly from 3mm - 17mm for single-ended dilators or 3mm/4mm - 17mm/18mm for double-ended dilators, though configurations with sizes anywhere from 1mm to 26mm do exist.

Use in the treatment of vaginismus 
Hegar dilators are used to treat vaginismus, also known as genito-pelvic pain disorder. Patients with vaginismus use Hegar dilators of gradually increasing size, potentially followed by penetration by their partner. They have also found application in the management of hymenal stenosis.

Cervical procedure use

Hegar dilators are used to induce cervical dilation in order to gain entry to the interior of the uterus.

During the process of dilation, the cervix may have to be stabilized with a tenaculum, and then the dilators are slowly entered into the cervical canal with a lubricant, starting with a thin, low Hegar number rod and progressing gradually to larger numbers. The dilators can also be used to sound the uterus.

Hegar dilators are widely used in gynecology to open up the cervix. This may be necessary prior to a uterine curettage or biopsy. They are also used to overcome stenosis in non-gynecological situations, such as in urology and proctology.

Laminaria rods have also been used to open up the cervix but work slowly as they increase size by absorbing water.

Penile implant procedure use
Hegar dilators (commonly, sizes 11 and 12) are used during the insertion of two intracorporal cylinders into the Corpus cavernosum penis as part of an Inflatable penile implant procedure. These cylinders are inflated and deflated by a pump that moves sterile saline under pressure between a holding reservoir and the cylinders, inflating or deflating an erection of the penis.

References

Surgical instruments
Gynaecology